Johann Edmund Schallenberg (October 11, 1913 – March 28, 1999) was an American male handball player. He was a member of the United States men's national handball team. He was part of the  team at the 1936 Summer Olympics, playing 3 matches. On club level he played for German Sport Club Brooklyn in the United States.

References

1913 births
1999 deaths
American male handball players
Olympic handball players of the United States
Field handball players at the 1936 Summer Olympics
Sportspeople from New York (state)